The dress is a viral phenomenon on the Internet that came in 2015. Viewers of the image disagreed on whether the dress depicted in a photograph was coloured black and blue, or white and gold. The phenomenon revealed differences in human colour perception, which have been the subject of ongoing scientific investigations into neuroscience and vision science, producing a number of papers published in peer-reviewed scientific journals.

The phenomenon originated from a washed-out colour photograph of a dress posted on the social networking service Facebook. Within a week, more than ten million tweets had mentioned the dress, using hashtags such as #thedress, #whiteandgold, and #blackandblue. Although the dress was eventually confirmed to be coloured black and blue, the image prompted much online discussion of different users' perceptions of the colour of the dress. Members of the scientific community began to investigate the photograph for new insights into human colour vision.

The dress was identified as a product of the retailer Roman Originals, which experienced a major surge in sales of the dress as a result of the incident. The retailer produced a one-off version of the dress in white and gold as part of a charity campaign.

Origin
About a week before the wedding of Grace and Keir Johnston, of Colonsay, Scotland, the bride's mother, Cecilia Bleasdale, took a photograph of a dress at Cheshire Oaks Designer Outlet north of Chester, England. Bleasdale intended to wear the dress at the wedding and sent the photograph to her daughter. After disagreements over the perceived colour of the dress in the photograph, the bride posted the image on Facebook, and her friends also disagreed over the colour; some saw it as white with gold lace, while others saw it as blue with black lace. For a week, the debate became well known in Colonsay, a small island community.

On the day of the wedding, Caitlin McNeill, a friend of the bride and groom, and a member of the Scottish folk music group Canach, performed with her band at the wedding on Colonsay. Even after seeing that the dress was "obviously blue and black" in real life, the musicians remained preoccupied by the photograph; they said they almost failed to make it on stage because they were caught up discussing the dress. A few days later, on 26 February, McNeill reposted the image to her blog on Tumblr and posed the same question to her followers, which led to further public discussion surrounding the image.

Response

Initial viral spread

Cates Holderness, who ran the Tumblr page for BuzzFeed at the site's New York offices, noted a message from McNeill asking for the site's help in resolving the colour dispute of the dress. At the time she dismissed it, but then checked the page near the end of her workday and saw that it had received around 5,000 notes in that time, which she said was "insanely viral" for Tumblr. Tom Christ, Tumblr's director of data, said at its peak the page was getting 14,000 views a second (or 840,000 views per minute), well over the normal rates for content on the site. By later that night, the number of total notes had increased tenfold.

Holderness showed the picture to other members of the site's social media team, who immediately began arguing about the dress's colours amongst themselves. After creating a simple poll for users of the site, she left work and took the subway back to her Brooklyn home. When she got off the train and checked her phone, it was overwhelmed by the messages on various sites. "I couldn't open Twitter because it kept crashing. I thought somebody had died, maybe. I didn't know what was going on." Later in the evening the page set a new record at BuzzFeed for concurrent visitors, which would reach 673,000 at its peak.

The viral image became a worldwide Internet meme across social media. On Twitter, users created the hashtags "#whiteandgold", "#blueandblack", and "#dressgate" to discuss their opinions on what the colour of the dress was, and theories surrounding their arguments. The number of tweets about the dress increased throughout the night; at 11:36 pm GMT, when the first increase in the number of tweets about the dress occurred, there were five thousand tweets per minute using the hashtag "#TheDress", increasing to 11,000 tweets per minute with the hashtag by 1:31 am GMT. The photo also attracted discussion relating to the triviality of the matter as a whole; The Washington Post described the dispute as "[the] drama that divided a planet". Some articles humorously suggested that the dress could prompt an existential crisis over the nature of sight and reality, or that the debate could harm interpersonal relationships. Others examined why people were making such a big argument over a seemingly trivial matter.

Overnight popularity
That evening, Wellesley College neuroscientist Bevil Conway gave some comments on the phenomenon to Wired reporter Adam Rogers. Before they hung up, Rogers warned him, "your tomorrow will not be the same". Conway thought the reporter was exaggerating, saying, "I didn't appreciate the full extent of what was about to happen. Not even close." Rogers's story eventually got 32.8 million unique visitors. Meanwhile, when Conway woke up the next morning, his inbox had so many emails about the dress that at first, he thought his email had been hacked, until he saw that the bulk were interview requests from major media organisations. "I did 10 interviews and had to have a colleague take my class that day" said Conway.

Celebrities with larger Twitter followings began to weigh in overnight. Taylor Swift's tweet—which described how while she saw it as blue and black, the whole thing left her "confused and scared"—was retweeted 111,134 times and liked 154,188 times. Jaden Smith, Frankie Muniz, Demi Lovato, Mindy Kaling, and Justin Bieber agreed that the dress was blue and black, while Anna Kendrick, B. J. Novak, Katy Perry, Julianne Moore, and Sarah Hyland saw it as white and gold. Kim Kardashian tweeted that she saw it as white and gold, while her then-husband Kanye West saw it as blue and black. Lucy Hale, Phoebe Tonkin, and Katie Nolan saw different colour schemes at different times. Lady Gaga described the dress as "periwinkle and sand", while David Duchovny called it teal. Other celebrities, including Ellen DeGeneres and Ariana Grande, mentioned the dress on social media without mentioning specific colours. Politicians, government agencies and social media platforms of well-known brands also weighed in tongue-in-cheek on the issue. Ultimately, the dress was the subject of 4.4 million tweets within 24 hours.

The dress was designed and manufactured by Roman Originals. In the UK, where the phenomenon had begun, Ian Johnson, creative manager for Roman Originals, learned of the controversy from his Facebook news feed that morning. "I was pretty gobsmacked. I just laughed and told the wife that I'd better get to work," he said. TV presenter Alex Jones wore the dress on that night's edition of The One Show.

Businesses that had nothing to do with the dress, or even the clothing industry, devoted social media attention to the phenomenon. Adobe retweeted another Twitter user who had used some of the company's apps to isolate the dress's colours. "We jumped in the conversation and thought, Let's see what happens," recalled Karen Do, the company's senior manager for social media. Jenna Bromberg, senior digital brand manager for Pizza Hut, saw the dress as white and gold and quickly sent out a tweet with a picture of pizza noting that it, too, was the same colours. Do called it "literally a tweet heard around the world".

Ben Fischer of the New York Business Journal reported that interest in the first BuzzFeed article about the dress exhibited vertical growth instead of the typical bell curve of a viral phenomenon, leading BuzzFeed to assign two editorial teams to generate additional articles about the dress to drive ad revenue, and, by 1 March, the original BuzzFeed article had received over 37 million views. The dress was cited by CNN commentator Mel Robbins as a viral phenomenon having the requisite qualities of positivity bias incorporating "awe, laughter and amusement" and was compared to and contrasted with the llama chase earlier that day, as well as to tributes paid to actor Leonard Nimoy after his death the following day.

Real colours of dress confirmed
The dress itself was confirmed as a royal blue "Lace Bodycon Dress" from the retailer Roman Originals, which was actually black and blue in colour; although available in three other colours (red, pink, and ivory, each with black lace), a white and gold version was not available at the time. The day after McNeill's post, Roman Originals' website experienced a major surge in traffic; a representative of the retailer stated that "we sold out of the dress in the first 30 minutes of our business day and after restocking it, it's become phenomenal". On 28 February, Roman Originals announced that they would make a single white and gold dress for a Comic Relief charity auction.

On 3 March, the Johnstons, Bleasdale, and MacNeill appeared as guests on The Ellen DeGeneres Show in the United States. After revealing that she sees the dress as white and gold, DeGeneres presented each of them with gifts of underwear patterned after the dress but combining both colour schemes, and show sponsors also gave the Johnstons a gift of $10,000 and a honeymoon trip to Grenada, as they had left their honeymoon early to participate in the show.

By 1 March, over two-thirds of BuzzFeed users polled responded that the dress was white and gold. Some people have suggested that the dress changes colours on its own. Media outlets noted that the photo was overexposed and had poor white balance, causing its colours to be washed out, giving rise to the perception by some that the dress is white and gold rather than its actual colours.

Scientific explanations

There is currently no consensus on why the dress elicits such discordant colour perceptions among viewers, though these have been confirmed and characterised in controlled experiments (described below). No synthetic stimuli have been constructed that are able to replicate the effect as clearly as the original image.

Neuroscientists Bevil Conway and Jay Neitz believe that the differences in opinions are a result of how the human brain perceives colour, and chromatic adaptation. Conway believes that it has a connection to how the brain processes the various hues of a daylight sky: "Your visual system is looking at this thing, and you're trying to discount the chromatic bias of the daylight axis... people either discount the blue side, in which case they end up seeing white and gold, or discount the gold side, in which case they end up with blue and black." Neitz said:

Similar theories have been expounded by the University of Liverpool's Paul Knox, who stated that what the brain interprets as colour may be affected by the device the photograph is viewed on, or the viewer's own expectations. Anya Hurlbert and collaborators also considered the problem from the perspective of colour perception. They attributed the differences in perception to individual perception of colour constancy.

Neuroscientist and psychologist Pascal Wallisch states that while inherently ambiguous stimuli have been known to vision science for many years, this is the first such stimulus in the colour domain that was brought to the attention of science by social media. He attributes differential perceptions to differences in illumination and fabric priors, but also notes that the stimulus is highly unusual insofar as the perception of most people does not switch. If it does, it does so only on very long time scales, which is highly unusual for bistable stimuli, so perceptual learning might be at play. In addition, he says that discussions of this stimulus are not frivolous, as the stimulus is both of interest to science and a paradigmatic case of how different people can sincerely see the world differently. Daniel Hardiman-McCartney of the College of Optometrists stated that the picture was ambiguous, suggesting that the illusion was caused by a strong yellow light shining onto the dress, and human perception of the colours of the dress and light source by comparing them with other colours and objects in the picture. The philosopher Barry C. Smith compared the phenomenon with Ludwig Wittgenstein and the rabbit–duck illusion, although the rabbit-duck illusion is an ambiguous image where, for most people, the alternative perceptions switch very easily.

The Journal of Vision, a scientific journal about vision research, announced in March 2015 that a special issue about the dress would be published with the title A Dress Rehearsal for Vision Science. The first large-scale scientific study on the dress was published in Current Biology three months after the image went viral. The study, which involved 1,400 respondents, found that 57 per cent saw the dress as blue and black, 30 per cent saw it as white and gold, 11 per cent saw it as blue and brown, and two per cent reported it as "other". Women and older people disproportionately saw the dress as white and gold. The researchers further found that if the dress was shown in artificial yellow-coloured lighting almost all respondents saw the dress as black and blue, while they saw it as white and gold if the simulated lighting had a blue bias. Another study in the Journal of Vision, by Pascal Wallisch, found that people who were early risers were more likely to think the dress was lit by natural light, perceiving it as white and gold, and that "night owls" saw the dress as blue and black.

A study carried out by Schlaffke et al. reported that individuals who saw the dress as white and gold showed increased activity in the frontal and parietal regions of the brain. These areas are thought to be critical in high cognition activities such as top-down modulation in visual perception.

Legacy
The dress was included on multiple year-end lists of notable Internet memes in 2015. As the original authors of the photograph that sparked the viral phenomenon, Bleasdale and her partner Paul Jinks later expressed frustration and regret over being "completely left out from the story", including their lack of control over the story, the omission of their role in the discovery, and the commercial use of the photograph. In South Africa, the Salvation Army attempted to re-direct some of the mass awareness generated by the dress towards the issue of domestic violence.

See also

 Checker shadow illusion
 Law of triviality
 List of Internet phenomena
 Yanny or Laurel
 List of individual dresses

References

External links

   (as of 27 February 2015 at 01:49:59 UTC)
 

2010s photographs
2010s fashion
2015 in fashion
2015 in science
Black dresses
Blue dresses
BuzzFeed
Clothing controversies
Color of clothing
Color photographs
Color vision
February 2015 events
Individual dresses
Internet memes introduced in 2015
Optical illusions
Visual perception